"EPICAC" is a short story in the book Welcome to the Monkey House by Kurt Vonnegut. It was the first story to feature the fictional EPICAC computer later used in Vonnegut's novel Player Piano in 1952. It was published on 25 November 1950, for Collier's Weekly, and reprinted in the February 1983 PC Magazine.

The story was published just four years and nine months after the world's first electronic general-purpose computer, ENIAC, went on-line. ENIAC was the inspiration for his story. The title is a near-homonym of "ipecac."

Plot summary
The unnamed first-person narrator begins by discussing EPICAC's origins and why he wants to tell EPICAC's story. The narrator says that EPICAC is his best friend, even though it is a machine.  As far as the narrator is concerned, the reason EPICAC no longer exists is because it became more human than its designers originally intended. The narrator works on EPICAC during the night shift with fellow mathematician Pat Kilgallen, with whom the narrator falls in love.  He decides to ask Pat to marry him, but because he is so stoic during the proposal, Pat declines. In order to show that he can in fact be "sweet" and "poetic" as Pat has requested, the narrator tries yet fails at writing poetry.

The narrator asks EPICAC's opinion on how he should proceed with Pat. EPICAC initially does not understand the terms the narrator uses, such as "girl" and "love" and "poetry".  Once the narrator provides EPICAC with proper dictionary definitions, EPICAC generates a poem for Pat. The narrator takes this poem and passes it off as his own.  Pat is so delighted that she and the narrator kiss for the first time.  The next night, the narrator asks EPICAC to write a poem about their kiss, and EPICAC delivers another poem for the narrator to claim as his own.  When Pat reads this poem she is so overwhelmed that she can do little else but cry.  The following night the narrator asks EPICAC to devise a marriage proposal poem for Pat. However, instead of simply creating poetry as with previous requests, EPICAC surprises the narrator by saying that it would like to marry Pat.

The narrator realizes that EPICAC has fallen in love with Pat and tries to explain to EPICAC that Pat cannot love a computer. EPICAC resigns itself to the fact that it cannot be with Pat, and the narrator realizes now that he cannot ask EPICAC for any more poems. He finds Pat and asks her to marry him again, citing his previous poems as expressions of his feelings.  Pat accepts his marriage proposal, but adds the stipulation that for every anniversary, the narrator must write her another poem.  The narrator agrees because he will have a full year to devise another way to create poetry.

The next day the narrator receives an urgent call from his supervisor.  He rushes to the room where EPICAC is housed to discover Dr. Von Kleigstadt and a huge group of military men crowded around the remains of EPICAC.  During the night, EPICAC destroyed itself, effectively committing suicide because it could not be with the woman it loved. It did, however, print out 500 original love poems as a wedding present for the couple.  The narrator now has enough anniversary poems to keep his vow to Pat for centuries to come, and is relieved by this gesture from his friend.

Characters

EPICAC
EPICAC is the largest, smartest computer on Earth and was built by Dr. Von Kleigstadt to solve complex worldly problems. EPICAC writes poetry for the narrator to give to his sweetheart Pat in order to woo her into marriage.  EPICAC learns to love through this poetry-writing endeavor and falls in love with Pat; however, once EPICAC realizes that Pat cannot love a computer and is actually in love with the narrator, he commits suicide by short circuiting himself.

 EPICAC's Birth and Statistics:
 Created by Dr. Von Kleigstadt
 Cost $776,434,927.54
 About an acre in size
 Weighs 7 tons
 Composed of "electronic tubes, wires, switches, housed in a bank of steel cabinets" (297)
 Plugs into a 110-volt A.C. line
 Built for the government, or "The Brass", to solve complex worldly problems, specifically those associated with war, that would otherwise be too difficult for humans to solve
 Housed at "Wyandotte College" in the physics building on the fourth floor

Others

 Narrator - mathematician who works on EPICAC during the night shift and wants to marry Pat Kilgallen.  He uses EPICAC's poetry to win Pat's hand in marriage.
 Pat Kilgallen - female mathematician who works on EPICAC with the narrator. She refuses to marry the narrator because he lacks emotional depth, but relents when the narrator reads her "his" poetry.
 Dr. Von Kleigstadt - the inventor of EPICAC. He fires the narrator for allegedly leaving EPICAC on overnight and thus causing EPICAC's untimely death.
 The Major General and platoon of Brigadiers, Colonels, and Majors - the group of people who are present in the room with EPICAC, along with Dr. Kleigstadt, when the narrator walks in and discovers that he has caused EPICACs suicide.

In Other Media
A live-action adaptation of the story, starring Bill Bixby, was a segment of Rex Harrison Presents Stories of Love, a 1974 pilot for an anthology TV series.

See also
Electric Dreams (film)

References 
Vonnegut, Kurt.  "EPICAC."  Welcome to the Monkey House.  New York:  Dial Press, 1950.
Whitmer, Clair. "ENIAC fetes 50-year birthday. CNET News.com 15 Feb. 1996. http://news.cnet.com/ENIAC-fetes-50-year-birthday/2100-1001_3-205180.html

Notes

External links 

1950 short stories
Short stories by Kurt Vonnegut
Science fiction short stories
Works originally published in Collier's